RUM may refer to:

 the Remington Ultra Magnum family of cartridges
 the United States Department of Defense aerospace vehicle designation#Rocket/missile launch environment for a ship-launched, anti-submarine guided missile
 Real user monitoring, a term used in measuring internet web application performance
 University of Puerto Rico at Mayagüez
 Rigid unit modes, phonon modes in which polyhedra are free to move by translation and/or rotation without distortion

See also 
 Rum (disambiguation)